This is a 2009 list of military equipment used by the Bolivian Armed Forces.

Firearms

Vehicles

Mortars, artillery, AA and AT weapons

Notes

References 

 
Bolivia